Roald Amundsen (1872–1928) was a Norwegian polar explorer who made a number of notable achievements during his lifetime, including leading the first expedition to the South Pole in 1911.

In recognition of Amundsen's accomplishments, a number of places in the Arctic and Antarctic have been named after him, as well as numerous entities in other fields.

Places

Antarctic

 Amundsen–Scott South Pole Station, jointly named with his rival Robert Falcon Scott
 Amundsen Sea, arm of the Southern Ocean
 Amundsen Plain, abyssal plain in the Southern Ocean
 Amundsen Bay
 Amundsen Coast
 Amundsen Glacier
 Amundsen Icefall
 Mount Amundsen

Arctic
 Amundsen-Nobile Climate Change Tower, research tower in Svalbard, jointly named with Umberto Nobile
 Amundsen Basin, abyssal plain in the Arctic Ocean
 Amundsen Gulf, arm of the Arctic Ocean
 Amundsen Land,  Greenland
 Roaldryggen, mountain ridge in Svalbard

Elsewhere
 Amundsen Circle, in Staten Island, New York
 Amundsena Street, in Moscow, Russia

Extraterrestrial
 Amundsen, crater near the Moon's south pole
 1065 Amundsenia, asteroid

Ships

 HNoMS Roald Amundsen, frigate of the Royal Norwegian Navy
 CCGS Amundsen, icebreaker and Arctic research vessel of the Canadian Coast Guard
 MS Roald Amundsen, Norwegian cruise ship
 Roald Amundsen, German brig

People
 Roald Dahl, British author
 Roald Hoffmann, American chemist and Nobel Prize laureate
 Roald Sagdeev, Russian physicist

Other
 Roald Amundsen (PH-BTE), Boeing 737 of KLM
 Roald Amundsen (LN-LNE), Boeing 787 of Norwegian Long Haul
 Roald Amundsen, a private railway car built by the Pullman Company
 Amundsen, one of two probes on the Deep Space 2 mission
 Amundsen High School, in Chicago, Illinois
 Amundsen, 2019 biographical film about Amundsen's life
 Amundsenia which is a genus of saxicolous lichens in the family Teloschistaceae

See also
 
 
 Amundsen (disambiguation)

References

Amundsen